Lemery may refer to:

Places
Two places in the Philippines:
Lemery, Batangas
Lemery, Iloilo

Other uses
 Lémery, a French surname